Pearu Paulus (born 3 November 1967) is an Estonian singer.

He has participated in competition "Kaks takti ette". In 1994 he participated in Eurolaul (with Hedvig Hanson); although their song "Kallim kullast" didn't win the competition, the song was chosen as "public favourite".

He has been a member of the band 2 Quick Start.

Discography
With 2 Quick Start:
 "Olen loobuda sust proovinud" (1995)
 "Poolel teel su juurde" (1997)
 "Teine pool, The Very Best of Vol. 1" (1999)
 "Ühega miljoneist" (2001)
 "2010" (2010)

References

Living people
1967 births
20th-century Estonian male singers
21st-century Estonian male singers
People from Keila